Villarroya de la Sierra is a municipality in the Province of Zaragoza, Aragon, Spain. According to the 2004 census (INE), the municipality has a population of 622 inhabitants.

The town is located in the Sierra de la Virgen range.

Notable people
 

Francisco Aranda Millán (1881–1937), Spanish zoologist

References

Municipalities in the Province of Zaragoza